Halili Nagime (born March 15, 1993) is a Brazilian-American soccer player who currently plays for Miami Dade FC in the American Premier Soccer League.

Career
After spending a short time with Auckland City FC, Nagime signed with NASL club Fort Lauderdale Strikers.  He made his debut for the Strikers on May 19, 2012 in a 3–1 loss to Minnesota Stars FC. Nagime ended his contract with  the Strikers on August 15. Now Halili plays for Miami Dade FC for the 2015 season.

References

External links
 North American Soccer League profile
 Auckland City FC bio

1993 births
Living people
American soccer players
American expatriate soccer players
Auckland City FC players
Fort Lauderdale Strikers players
American sportspeople of Brazilian descent
Expatriate association footballers in New Zealand
North American Soccer League players
Association football forwards